Kalianoor or Kaliyanur is a village in Namakkal district in the Indian state of Tamil Nadu.

Demographics
 census, Kalianoor had a population of 6407.

References

Cities and towns in Namakkal district